is a chemical company based in Japan. It operates business in celluloid technologies, organic chemicals, high-performance chemicals, polymers and pyrotechnic devices. The company's products include cellulose acetate, tow for cigarette filters, high-performance chemicals, engineering plastics like liquid crystal polymers (LPCs), resin compounds, and automotive airbag inflators.

The company formed under the name of Dainippon Celluloid Company from a 1919 merger of eight regional celluloid manufacturers and changed its name to the present one in 1966. Its first subsidiary, Fuji Photo Film, was set up in 1934 to produce nitrocellulose film. Eventually this company became Fujifilm.

References

External links

 Official global website 
  Wiki collection of bibliographic works on Daicel

Chemical companies based in Tokyo
Companies listed on the Tokyo Stock Exchange
Japanese companies established in 1919
Chemical companies established in 1919
Japanese brands
Manufacturing companies based in Osaka
Defense companies of Japan
Mitsui